Munggu Antan inscription is an inscription in the form of a stone stele found in the village of Bulus, Purworejo Regency, which was once included in the Kedu Residency (now in Central Java, Indonesia). This inscription contains the designation of the village Munggu Antan as a sima (a tax free village) dedicated to a temple in Gusali, and it is written in Sanskrit. This inscription was issued by Sang Pamegat Munggu and his younger sister Sang Hadyan Palutungan, who was also the wife of Sang Dewata (high official, nobleman) at Pastika, at the behest of Sri Maharaja Rake Gurunwangi, dated 808 Saka or 887 CE.

Currently the inscription is stored at the National Museum of Indonesia, with an inventory collection number D. 93.

Transliteration
The transliteration of the inscription according to the reading of J.L.A Brandes:

Translation
The translation of part of the inscription according to R. Soekmono:

 ...Sang Pamegat Munggu and his sister, Sang Hadyan Palutungan, who had been the wife of His Majesty Sang Dewata at Pastika, fixed the boundaries of the village Munggu Antan, which in its entirety was to become a sima for the Vihara of Gusali...
 ...on the order of His Majesty the King, Rake Gurunwangi...

See also
Mataram Kingdom

References

Mataram Kingdom
Sanskrit inscriptions in Indonesia
History of Central Java